Denis Hardy may refer to:

Denis Hardy (economist), Canadian economist
Denis Hardy (politician) (1936–2016), Canadian politician